Jay Robert Thomson (born 12 April 1986) is a South African former professional racing cyclist, who rode professionally between 2007 and 2020, for the , , ,  and  teams. In 2013 he won the South African National Road Race Championships. He rode in the 2014 Vuelta a España. He was named in the start list for the 2016 Giro d'Italia. In July 2018, he was named in the start list for the 2018 Tour de France.

Major results

2006
 6th Road race, African Road Championships
2007
 3rd  Road race, African Road Championships
2008
 African Road Championships
1st  Time trial
7th Road race
 1st  Overall Tour d'Egypte
1st Stages 1 & 2
 7th Overall Coupe des nations Ville Saguenay
2009
 African Road Championships
1st  Time trial
1st  Team time trial
2nd  Road race
2010
 1st Stage 2 Tour de Langkawi
 3rd Overall Tour of Wellington
1st Stage 3
 3rd Tour of the Battenkill
2011
 2nd  Road race, All-Africa Games
 2nd Time trial, National Road Championships
2012
 1st Stage 1 Volta a Portugal
 African Road Championships
2nd  Road race
3rd  Time trial
 2nd Time trial, National Road Championships
2013
 National Road Championships
1st  Road race
2nd Time trial
 1st Stage 1 Tour of Rwanda
2014
 National Road Championships
2nd Time trial
3rd Road race
2015
 African Road Championships
2nd  Road race
2nd  Team time trial
 4th Time trial, National Road Championships

Grand Tour general classification results timeline

References

External links

1986 births
Living people
South African male cyclists
People from Krugersdorp
African Games silver medalists for South Africa
African Games medalists in cycling
Competitors at the 2011 All-Africa Games
White South African people
Sportspeople from Gauteng